The 2014 Indian general election polls in Manipur for two Lok Sabha seats was held in two phases on 9 – 17 April 2014.
Voters turnout in Manipur was 80%.

Opinion polling

Election schedule

The constituency-wise election schedule is given below –

Results
The results of the elections will be declared on 16 May 2014.

Constituency wise

References

Indian general elections in Manipur
2010s in Manipur
Manipur